was a Japanese politician who co-founded the now defunct New Liberal Club in 1976, and served as its president from 1979 until 1984.

Tagawa graduated from Keio University with a B.L. in December 1941. After that, he worked in the Imperial Japanese Army and The Asahi Shimbun Company.

Tagawa was first elected to the House of Representatives of Japan in 1960. He would ultimately be re-elected to the House in eleven elections.

Tagawa and a group of other lawmakers, including Yōhei Kōno, broke away from the ruling Liberal Democratic Party (LDP) in 1976. Tagawa, Yohei and the others founded the New Liberal Club political party on June 25, 1976.

The New Liberal Club formed a coalition government with the LDP in December 1983. Tagawa became the Minister of Home Affairs within the government of Prime Minister Yasuhiro Nakasone as part of the coalition agreement.

The New Liberal Club was disbanded in 1986 and rejoined the LDP on August 15, 1986. Following the disbanding of the New Liberal Club, Tagawa went on to found a second political party, the short-lived and now defunct Progressive Party.

Tagawa spent the rest of his career campaigning against political corruption. He retired from politics in 1993.

Seiichi Tagawa died from complications of old age at a nursing home in Yokosuka, Kanagawa Prefecture, on August 7, 2009, at the age of 91.

Tagawa's cousin, Yōhei Kōno, served as the Speaker of the House of Representatives of Japan until the House was dissolved in July 2009 in preparation for the 2009 general election.

References

|-

|-

|-

|-

|-

1918 births
2009 deaths
Government ministers of Japan
People from Yokosuka, Kanagawa
The Asahi Shimbun people
New Liberal Club politicians
Liberal Democratic Party (Japan) politicians
Keio University alumni
Imperial Japanese Army personnel